Ville de Paris may refer to:

 Paris
 French ship Ville de Paris, several ships
 HMS Ville de Paris
 La Ville de Paris (airship) 
 Ville de Paris (department store), Los Angeles, early 20th c.